Copelatus striatopterus is a species of diving beetle. It is part of the subfamily Copelatinae in the family Dytiscidae. It was described by Aubé in 1838.

References

striatopterus
Beetles described in 1838